Leszek Lipka is a retired Polish soccer  player, a midfielder, who spent all his active career in Wisła Kraków. Born June 4, 1958 in Kraków, Lipka debuted in Ekstraklasa in the late 1970s, and remained in Wisła until 1990. He played in 76 official Wisła games, scoring three goals himself. On May 2, 1979, he capped for the first time for the national team of Poland, in a 2-0 victory against the Netherlands national football team, at the Silesian Stadium in Chorzów. Lipka was a starter of the Polish team under manager Ryszard Kulesza, and scored a goal in a 2-0 victory versus Malta in December 1980. Altogether, he capped 21 times for Poland, with his last game taking place on March 25, 1981 in Bucharest, versus Romania. After retiring, he managed several lower class teams of Lesser Poland. Currently, he is a coach of Dąbski KS Kraków.

Notes 

1958 births
Living people
Polish footballers
Poland international footballers
Wisła Kraków players
Footballers from Kraków
Association football midfielders